Dongtundu Subdistrict is an urban subdistrict and the seat of Furong District, Changsha City, Hunan Province, China. The subdistrict is located in the south central part of the district. It borders Hehuayuan Subdistrict to the west, Huoxing and Mawangdui Subdistricts to the north, Dong'an Subdistrict to the east, Gaoqiao Subdistrict of Yuhua District.

History
The subdistrict of Dongtundu was formerly the State-owned Dongtundu Farm established in 1959. It was transferred to the jurisdiction of Furong District in the 1996 municipal districts of adjustment of Changsha. In September 1998, Dongtundu Subdistrict Office was formally listed, maintaining the structure of the state-owned Dongtundu Farm, implementing a management model with two brands and a group management team. In 2012, the subdivisions in Furong District were adjusted. The newly established Dongtundu Subdistrict maintained four communities of Dongtundu, Furong, Yangfan and Jiayu of the former Dongtundu Subdistrict, the village of Nongke was transferred to it from the former Mawangdui Subdistrict. The four communities of Hehuayuan, Dezhengyuan, Dongfang Xincheng and Dongjun were transferred out of the subdistrict. Dongtundu Subdistrict administers five communities of Dongtundu, Furong, Yangfan, Jiayu and Baishawan, and Nongke Village.

Subdivision
The subdistrict of Dongtundu administered a village and five communities in 2015. Through the amalgamation of village-level divisions in 2016, its division was reduced to five from six, the subdistrict has five communities under its jurisdiction.

 Baishawan Community
 Dongtundu Community
 Hibiscus Community
 Jiayu Community
 Sailing Community

References

Subdistricts of Changsha
Furong District